Maugeri is a surname. Notable people with the surname include:

 Francesco Maugeri (1898–1978), Italian admiral
 Leonardo Maugeri (1964–2017), Italian oil and gas expert
 Massimo Maugeri (born 1968), Italian journalist
 Mauro Maugeri (1959–2017), Italian water polo coach and player

Italian-language surnames